Zagreb school of animated films is a style of animation originating from Zagreb and Croatia, most notably Zagreb Film. It is represented by authors like Nikola Kostelac, Vatroslav Mimica, Dušan Vukotić and Vladimir Kristl. The term was coined by Georges Sadoul.

The "golden age" of Zagreb School spanned between 1957 and 1980, in three waves, each dominated by a different group of animators. The first major success was a Grand Prix award in Venice for the animated short Samac (Lonely guy) by Vatroslav Mimica, and their greatest work is an Oscar-winning animated short Surogat by Dušan Vukotić.

History
The history of animation in Zagreb begins in 1922, with two short animated commercials done by Sergej Tagatz. The first production company "Škola narodnog zdravlja" (represented by director Milan Marjanović, artist Petar Papp) continued making animated shorts such as Macin Nos, Ivin Zub and Martin u nebo in the period 1928 - 1929. In the 30s, more animated commercials were produced by Maar-Reklama film company.

Following World War II, Walter Neugebauer created the animated film Svi na izbore in 1945, under heavy influence of Disney animation. This was followed by other satirical works such as the propaganda film Veliki miting, produced in 1951 by Jadran Film.

According to researcher Ronald Holloway, the two primary influences on the Zagreb School were Jiří Trnka's film The Gift (1947) and the American film The Four Poster, a live-action comedy-drama that features animation directed by John Hubley at United Productions of America (UPA). The Four Poster arrived Yugoslavia in "a batch of American feature films sent for possible sale to Yugoslavia", Holloway wrote, around the same time that director Dušan Vukotić read an article about UPA's style in Graphis at an English bookstore in Zagreb. Vukotić and others studied The Four Posters animation, which also gave them a greater understanding of the still images in Graphis. As a result, the team began to explore design-focused limited animation at Zagreb Film. The animation of Zagreb made its first major breakthrough with the short Samac (1958) by Vatroslav Mimica, which won the Grand Prix at the Venice Film Festival.  This was followed by the 1961 short Surogat by Dušan Vukotić, which won the Academy Award for Best Animated Short Film, the first non-American to do so. First animated shows began appearing during his time, such as Inspektor Maska (1962-1963), and the internationally renown Professor Balthazar (1967-1978) by Zlatko Grgić.

During the 80s and 90s, Croatia Film produced the country's first animated features, all directed by Milan Blažeković: The Elm-Chanted Forest, The Magician's Hat and Lapitch the Little Shoemaker.

Style and themes
According to Joško Marušić, the key feature of the Zagreb School was commitment to stylization, in contrast with the Disney-style canon of realistic animation. Its worldview  created a "genre of animated films for adults, films pregnant with cynicism, auto-irony, and the relativization of divisions between people", often focusing on the "little man" as a powerless subject of manipulation.

Animation awards
Animafest Zagreb was initiated by the International Animated Film Association (ASIFA), the event was established in 1972. Animafest is the second oldest animation festival in the World, after the Annecy International Animated Film Festival, (established in 1960).
Festival awards include prizes given in the Short film Competition, Feature film Competition, Student Film Competition, Children Films, Site-specific competition and Croatian competition. Its Prize for "Best First Production Apart from Educational Institutions" is named in honour of Zlatko Grgić. The Lifetime Achievement Award, which is unique for animation film festivals, was established in 1986. An award for outstanding contribution to the theory of animation was added in 2002.

See also 
Zagreb Film
Croatia Film
The Little Flying Bears

References

Further reading 
Filmska enciklopedija I. i II., Juhoslavenski leksikografski zavod Miroslav Krleža, gl. urednik dr. Ante Peterlić, Zagreb, 1986. i 1990.,
Zagrebački krug crtanog filma I (Građa za povijest hrvatske kulture), pedeset godina crtanog filma u Hrvatskoj, almanah 1922.-1972., uredio: Zlatko Sudović, Zagreb 1978.,
Škrabalo, Ivo: 101 godina filma u Hrvatskoj, 1896.-1997., Zagreb, Nakladni zavod Globus, 1998.,
Filmska kultura, broj 81-82, Zagreb 1972., 50 godina animacije,
Holloway, Ronald: “Z” is for Zagreb, London, The Tantivy Press, London,
Munitić, Ranko: Uvod u estetiku kinematografske animacije, Filmoteka 16, Zagreb, 1983.,
Denegri, Jerko: Exat 51, Nove tendencije, umjetnost konstruktivnog pristupa, Zagreb 2000.,
Bendazzi, Giannalberto: Cartoons, One hundred years of cinema animation, John Libbey & Company Ltd., London 1994.

Croatian animation studios
Mass media in Zagreb
1956 establishments in Croatia
Mass media companies established in 1956